Crispin is a surname. Notable people with the surname include:

 Ann C. Crispin (1950–2013), American science fiction writer
 Edmund Crispin (1921–1978), pseudonym of Robert Bruce Montgomery, an English crime writer
 Gilbert Crispin (c. 1055 – 1117), Christian author and Anglo-Norman monk.
 Jessa Crispin (born 1978), editor-in-chief of Bookslut, a litblog and webzine
 Joe Crispin (born 1979), American professional basketball player
 Jon Crispin (born 1981), American collegiate basketball player
 Mark Crispin (born 1956), inventor of the IMAP protocol